Jim Riswold (born 1957 in Seattle, Washington) was the former creative director for Portland, Oregon based advertising agency Wieden+Kennedy and an instructor for the agency's experimental advertising school, WK12: subject for WKE (WKEntertainment)'s upcoming web episodic documentary, 12.

Career In Advertising

Riswold attended the University of Washington from 1976 to 1983, and received three bachelor's degrees in communications, philosophy and history. He was brought into the agency as its first copywriter hire in 1984, supervising the Honda account. In his 14 years at Wieden+Kennedy, he created advertising campaigns such as the Mars Blackmon (Spike Lee), Michael Jordan commercials for Nike as well as the famous Bugs Bunny–Jordan pairing. He also created the Bo Knows campaign for Nike featuring Bo Jackson, and the Tiger Woods commercial, entitled "I Am Tiger Woods".

In 2013, Riswold was inducted into The One Club's Creative Hall of Fame.

Career In Art

After being diagnosed with leukemia in 2000 and surviving for five years, Riswold quit advertising to become a full-time contemporary artist. He went from "a career of selling people things they don't need to making things that people don't want".

Riswold's photographs have been shown in galleries throughout the Northwest and hang in the permanent collections of several museums. Most of his works poke fun at historically taboo figures such as Mao Zedong, Adolf Hitler and Benito Mussolini by constructing monumental setting in which the figurines were photographer. Riswold explained in his 2005 Esquire article, "Hitler Saved My Life" that "Instead of providing […] grand expositions mythologizing the dictator, toys, by definition, make their subjects seem small, childish, and trifling."

References

External links
 Jim Riswold's website
 Jim Riswold's art gallery display
 Hitler Saved My Life, Jim Riswold's Esquire essay

Living people
1957 births
Wieden+Kennedy people
University of Washington alumni